Vražale is a village in the municipality of Zelenikovo, North Macedonia.

Demographics
As of the 2021 census, Vražale had 26 residents with the following ethnic composition:
Albanians 23
Persons for whom data are taken from administrative sources 2
Turks 1

According to the 2002 census, the village had a total of 102 inhabitants. Ethnic groups in the village include:
Albanians 101
Others 1

References

Villages in Zelenikovo Municipality
Albanian communities in North Macedonia